The Angola river frog (Amietia angolensis), or common river frog, is a species of frog in the family Pyxicephalidae. Formerly, it was placed in the family Ranidae.

Distribution and habitat 
It is found in southern and eastern Africa.

Its natural habitats are subtropical or tropical moist lowland forests, subtropical or tropical moist montane forests, dry savanna, moist savanna, subtropical or tropical moist shrubland, subtropical or tropical dry lowland grassland, subtropical or tropical seasonally wet or flooded lowland grassland, subtropical or tropical high-altitude grassland, rivers, swamps, freshwater lakes, freshwater marshes, arable land, pastureland, rural gardens, urban areas, heavily degraded former forest, ponds, and canals and ditches.

It is not considered threatened by the IUCN.

Diet and predators 

Like other frogs, this frog feeds on worms and insects, such as locust. It is a prey to crocodiles, shoebills, and snakes.

References 

Amietia
Frogs of Africa
Amphibians of Angola
Amphibians of Ethiopia
Amphibians of Kenya
Amphibians of South Africa
Amphibians of Tanzania
Amphibians described in 1866
Taxonomy articles created by Polbot